Naima is the fifth album by Finnish producer Sasu Ripatti under the name Vladislav Delay.

It is an edit of his previous album Anima used to transform a park at the 2001 Ars Electronica festival.

Antye Greie (credited as "Girlfriend") appears on vocals.

Track listing
 "Anima" (42:08)

References 

2002 albums
Vladislav Delay albums